Waterville, Newfoundland and Labrador was a small settlement located east of Clarenville.

See also
 List of communities in Newfoundland and Labrador

Populated places in Newfoundland and Labrador